Ras-related protein Rab-40A is a protein that in humans is encoded by the RAB40A gene.

References

Further reading